Flaming Pie is the tenth solo studio album by English musician Paul McCartney, released on 5 May 1997 by Parlophone in the UK and Capitol Records in the US. His first studio album in over four years, it was mostly recorded after McCartney's involvement in the highly successful Beatles Anthology project. The album was recorded in several locations over two years, between 1995 and 1997, featuring two songs dating from 1992. 

The album featured several of McCartney's family members and friends, most notably McCartney's son, James McCartney featured on electric guitar. In Flaming Pies liner notes, McCartney said: "[The Beatles Anthology] reminded me of the Beatles' standards and the standards that we reached with the songs. So in a way it was a refresher course that set the framework for this album."

Flaming Pie peaked at number two in both the UK and the US and was certified gold. The album, which was well-received by critics, also reached the top 20 in many other countries. From its release up to mid-2007, the album sold over 1.5 million copies. The album was reissued on 31 July 2020 as a part of the Paul McCartney Archive Collection with bonus tracks, outtakes and demos.

The album is ranked number 988 in All-Time Top 1000 Albums (3rd edition, 2000).

Background

An early version of "Beautiful Night" was recorded in 1986. "Calico Skies", which McCartney had written when Hurricane Bob had hit while McCartney was staying on Long Island in 1991, and "Great Day", which features backing vocal from his wife Linda McCartney, hailed from a 1992 session, recorded before the 1993 release of album Off the Ground.

Starting from the mid-1990s for four years, McCartney was involved in The Beatles Anthology, a documentary on the history of the Beatles. The documentary was originally titled The Long and Winding Road, named after the Beatles song of the same name. During 1995, as the Anthology albums were starting to be released over a two-year period, EMI did not want McCartney to release a solo album in the meantime. McCartney said that he "was almost insulted at first" before then realising that "it would be silly to go out against yourself in the form of the Beatles. So I fell in with the idea and thought, 'Great, I don't even have to think about an album.'" 

McCartney was occupied with working on his second classical album Standing Stone in the interim.

Album title

The title Flaming Pie (also given to one of the album's songs) is a reference to an anecdote that John Lennon told in a humorous story published in magazine Mersey Beat in 1961 about the origin of the Beatles' name: "It came in a vision – a man appeared on a flaming pie and said unto them, 'from this day on you are Beatles with an A.' "

Recording and structure

Beginning in February 1995, McCartney teamed up with Jeff Lynne, Electric Light Orchestra lead singer, guitarist, songwriter, and producer, as well as an ardent Beatles fan. Lynne had previously worked with former Beatle George Harrison on his 1987 album Cloud Nine and in the Traveling Wilburys, and also co-produced "Free as a Bird" and "Real Love" for the Anthology project. Intending to produce something pure and easy – and without elaborate productions – McCartney sporadically recorded the entire album in a space of two years, working not only with Lynne, but with Steve Miller. The album also featured George Martin, Ringo Starr and his own son, James McCartney, who plays lead guitar on "Heaven on a Sunday". McCartney wrote the song "Young Boy" while his wife Linda was making lunch for a New York Times feature on 18 August 1994. McCartney and Miller started recording "Young Boy" on 22 February 1995 in Sun Valley, Idaho. They reconvened a few months afterwards in May at McCartney's home studio, The Mill, recording – a song described as a "road song" – "If You Wanna" and the jam track "Used to Be Bad" in the process.

The duo also recorded the B-side "Broomstick" and three unreleased tracks: "(Sweet Home) Country Girl", "Soul Boy", and an untitled song. Also in May, McCartney, by himself, recorded the unreleased tracks "Stella May Day", for his daughter Stella McCartney, which would be used playing over loudspeakers at her fashion shows, and "Whole Life" with Dave Stewart. "Somedays", which was written while McCartney was escorting Linda to Kent for a photo shoot, features an orchestration score by George Martin. "The Song We Were Singing", which was about the times McCartney and his former songwriting partner John Lennon were at 20 Forthlin Road, was recorded in  time. "Little Willow" was written for the children of Starr's first wife, Maureen Starkey Tigrett, who had recently died of cancer. "Souvenir" features the sound of a 78 rpm record towards the end of the track. The title track, recorded in a four-hour session, is in similar style to that of the Beatles' "Lady Madonna".

In May 1996, Starr and McCartney were working on a track that McCartney had started a decade earlier, "Beautiful Night", which featured vocals from Starr. Lynne showed up the next day and the trio, with McCartney on bass, Starr on drums, and Lynne on guitar, jammed, with the finished results being the track "Really Love You", the first track credited to McCartney–Starkey. McCartney and Starr also recorded the B-side "Looking for You" and an untitled song. "Heaven on a Sunday", which was written while McCartney was in the US sailing on holiday, was recorded on 16 September 1996, and features backing vocals by both Linda and James. Martin added orchestration to "Beautiful Night", on 14 February 1997 at Abbey Road Studios. An unreleased song recorded with Lynne producing, titled "Cello in the Ruins", was registered for copyright in 1994, although work on the song began in May 1995. The track was almost issued as a single for War Child's The Help Album in 1995. This album was the last McCartney studio album to feature vocals and participation from Linda, who died of breast cancer in 1998.

Release and reception

Upon its 1997 release, on 5 May in the UK on Parlophone and on 20 May in the US on Capitol Records|Capitol, the critical reaction to Flaming Pie was strong, with McCartney achieving his best reviews since 1982's Tug of War. With fresh credibility, even with young fans who had been introduced to him through the Anthology project, it debuted at number 2 in the UK in May, giving McCartney his best new entry since Flowers in the Dirt eight years before. It was kept off the top spot by the Spice Girls' album Spice. Flaming Pie was also received positively in the United States, where it became McCartney's first top 10 album since Tug of War. Flaming Pie debuted at number 2, with 121,000 copies sold in its first week, behind Spice, which sold 16,500 more copies that week.

In both the UK and the US, Flaming Pie was the most commercially successful new entry, and was certified gold in both countries. It was also certified gold in Norway. According to Nielsen SoundScan, the album had sold over 1.5 million copies worldwide up to June 2007.

Three singles were released from the album, "Young Boy", "The World Tonight" and "Beautiful Night", all of which were also released as picture discs, and all became UK top 40 hits. The only single in the US from the album was "The World Tonight", released on 17 April 1997, a top 30 entry on the Billboard mainstream rock listing. The singles featured two non-album b-sides recorded during Flaming Pie sessions: "Looking for You", additional jam with Ringo Starr and Jeff Lynne, and "Broomstick", additional track recorded with Steve Miller; and two tracks that were almost a decade old: "Love Come Tumbling Down" and "Same Love" recorded around the time of the sessions for "Once Upon a Long Ago" single and Flowers in the Dirt respectively. The singles also featured six Oobu Joobu mini episodes.

To promote the album, McCartney held an online chat party, and the event entered the Guinness Book of World Records for the most people in an online chatroom at once.

In the World Tonight, a film about the making of the album, was broadcast in the UK on ITV, and on VH1 in the US, around the release of the album. Also broadcast was an hour-long radio show about the album on 5 May 1997 on BBC Radio 2. It received a Grammy nomination for Album of the Year, although Bob Dylan won the award with his album Time Out of Mind. "Young Boy" and "The World Tonight" appeared in the 1997 Ivan Reitman comedy Fathers' Day.

Flaming Pie was reissued on 31 July 2020 as a part of the Paul McCartney Archive Collection. Bonus tracks include home demos, outtakes, rough mixes and selections from the radio series Oobu Joobu.

Track listing
All songs written by Paul McCartney, except where noted.

"The Song We Were Singing" – 3:55
"The World Tonight" – 4:06
"If You Wanna" – 4:38
"Somedays" – 4:15
"Young Boy" – 3:54
"Calico Skies" – 2:32
"Flaming Pie" – 2:30
"Heaven on a Sunday" – 4:27
"Used to Be Bad"  (Steve Miller, McCartney) – 4:12
"Souvenir" – 3:41
"Little Willow" – 2:58
"Really Love You" (McCartney, Richard Starkey) – 5:18
"Beautiful Night" – 5:09
"Great Day" – 2:09

Archive Collection Reissue

On 12 June 2020, it was officially announced that the album reissues of Flaming Pie would be released on 31 July 2020, as part of the Paul McCartney Archive Collection series. The Flaming Pie reissues were published in several editions:Special Edition (2-CD): The original 14-track album on the first disc, including previously unreleased home recordings, demos, and non-album singles on a second disc.Deluxe Edition (5-CD/2-DVD): The original 14-track album on the first disc, home recordings on the second disc, previously unreleased demos on the third disc, and non-album singles on a fourth disc. Also included are 2 DVDs containing the "In the World Tonight" documentary, original music videos, EPKs, interviews, performances and behind-the-scenes material.Gatefold Double Vinyl (2-LP): The original 14-track album remastered.Gatefold Triple Vinyl (3-LP): In addition to the original 14-track album, the third vinyl includes special home recordings, as well as a link to download materials.Collectors Edition (4-LP/5-CD/2-DVD): Contains the entire contents of the Deluxe Edition, as well as exclusive vinyl versions of the remastered album cut at half speed across 2 LPs in an exclusive gatefold sleeve and an LP of home recordings in a hand-stamped white label sleeve. Also included are six silkscreened Linda McCartney art prints and an exclusive etched vinyl pressing of "Ballad of the Skeletons", co-written with Allen Ginsberg, along with a similarly themed poster.Disc 1The original 14-track album.Disc 2 – Home Recordings"The Song We Were Singing"  – 5:26
"The World Tonight"  – 2:27
"If You Wanna"  – 3:01
"Somedays"  – 4:16
"Young Boy"  – 2:23
"Calico Skies"  – 2:32
"Flaming Pie"  – 1:41
"Souvenir"  – 2:56
"Little Willow"  – 2:27
"Beautiful Night"  – 4:27
"Great Day"  – 3:30Disc 3 – In The Studio"Great Day"  – 2:18
"Calico Skies"  – 2:06
"C'mon Down C'mon Baby" – 1:24
"If You Wanna"  – 1:55
"Beautiful Night"  – 4:10
"The Song We Were Singing"  – 3:51
"The World Tonight"  – 3:48
"Little Willow"  – 2:59
"Whole Life"  – 5:34
"Heaven On A Sunday"  – 4:43Disc 4 – Flaming Pies"The Ballad of the Skeletons" – 7:54
"Looking for You" – 4:42
"Broomstick"  – 5:10
"Love Come Tumbling Down" – 4:24
"Same Love" – 3:56
"Oobu Joobu"  – 8:48
"I Love This House" – 3:41
"Oobu Joobu"  – 8:27
"Atlantic Ocean" – 6:25
"Oobu Joobu"  – 7:57
"Squid" – 6:25
"Oobu Joobu"  – 5:31
"Don't Break the Promise" – 3:39
"Oobu Joobu"  – 8:48
"Beautiful Night"  – 4:02
"Oobu Joobu"  – 9:17
"Love Mix" – 3:02Disc 5 – Flaming Pie At The Mill "Intro" – 2:38
 "Mellotron and Synthesizer / Mini Moog" – 7:40
 "Harpsichord" – 3:26
 "Celeste" – 1:05
 "Piano" – 1:26
 "Bill Black Bass" – 3:05
 "Drums" – 3:57
 "Höfner Bass" – 2:16
 "Guitar" – 6:06
 "Spinet" – 2:16
 "Bells" – 3:20
 "Control Room" – 23:17Disc 6 – DVD (In The World Tonight)Disc 7 – DVD Bonus Films"Beautiful Night"
"Making of Beautiful Night"
"Little Willow"
"The World Tonight" 
"The World Tonight" 
"Young Boy" 
"Young Boy" 
"Flaming Pie EPK 1"
"Flaming Pie EPK 2"
"In the World Tonight EPK"
"Flaming Pie Album Artwork Meeting"
"TFI Friday Performances"
"David Frost interview"Additional download tracks available via paulmccartney.com'''
"Beautiful Night"  – 6:14
"Somedays"  – 4:29
"Calico Skies"  – 2:38via download code:''
"Great Day" 
"Beautiful Night/You're a Bastard"

Personnel
Personnel per booklet.

Musicians
 Paul McCartney – lead vocal, harmony vocal, electric guitar, acoustic guitar, bass guitar, double bass, drums, harmonium, piano, twelve-string guitar, Spanish guitar, Hammond organ, knee slap, Fender Rhodes, harpsichord, vibraphone, mellotron, backing vocals
 Jeff Lynne – harmony vocal, electric guitar, acoustic guitar, keyboard, backing vocals,  spinette, harpsichord
 Steve Miller – harmony vocal, electric guitar, acoustic guitar, backing vocal, rhythm guitar, lead vocal on "Used to Be Bad"
 Keith Pascoe, Jackie Hartley, Rita Manning, Peter Manning, Marcia Crayford, Adrian Levin, Belinda Bunt, Bernard Patridge, Jackie Hartley, Keith Pascoe, David Woodcock, Roger Garland, Julian Tear, Briony Shaw, Jeremy Williams, David Ogden, Bogustav Kostecki, Maciej Rakowski, Jonathan Rees – violin
 Christian Kampen, Martin Loveday, Anthony Pleeth, Stephen Orton, Martin Loveday, Robert Bailey – cello
 Peter Lale, Levine Andrade, Robert Smissen, Stephen Tess, Levine Andrade, Philip Dukes, Ivo Van Der Werff, Graeme Scott – viola
 Martin Parry, Susan Milan, Andy Findon, Michael Cox – flute
 Skaila Kanga – harp
 Roy Carter – oboe, English horn
 Linda McCartney – backing vocals
 James McCartney – electric guitar
 Michael Thompson, Richard Bissill, Richard Watkins, John Pigneguy – French horns
 Chris 'Snake' Davis, Dave Bishop – saxophone
 Ringo Starr – drums, percussion
 John Barclay, Kevin Robinson, Andrew Crowley, Mark Bennett – trumpet
 Richard Edwards, Andy Fawbert – trombone
 Michael Thompson, Richard Watkins, Nigel Black – horns
 Chris Laurence, Robin McGee – double bass
 David Theodore – oboe

Technical
 Paul McCartney, Jeff Lynne, George Martin – producers
 George Martin – orchestration
 David Snell – conductor
 Geoff Emerick, Jon Jacobs, Bob Kraushaar – engineers
 Keith Smith, Frank Farrell – assistant engineers
 Marc Mann – digital sequencing
 Geoff Emerick – orchestral session engineer on "Somedays"
 Geoff Foster – orchestral session assistant engineer on "Somedays"
 Geoff Emerick, Jon Jacobs, Peter Cabbin – orchestral session engineer on "Beautiful Night"
 Paul Hicks – orchestral session assistant engineer on "Beautiful Night"

Charts

Weekly charts

Year-end charts

Certifications and sales

References 
 Footnotes

 Citations

External links 

Flaming Pie at Graham Calkin's Beatles Pages

1997 albums
Albums arranged by George Martin
Albums produced by George Martin
Albums produced by Jeff Lynne
Albums produced by Paul McCartney
Parlophone albums
Paul McCartney albums
Albums recorded in a home studio